Eleftherios "Lefteris" Bochoridis (Greek: Ελευθέριος "Λευτέρης" Μποχωρίδης; born April 18, 1994) is a Greek professional basketball player for Panathinaikos of the Greek Basket League and the EuroLeague. Born in Thessaloniki, Greece, he is a left-handed, 1.96 m (6 ft 5 in) tall combo guard.

Early career
As a younger player, Bochoridis was speculated and compared by some as being a possible successor to fellow Greek player Dimitris Diamantidis in the future, but never quite lived up to those great expectations.

Professional career
Bochoridis began his pro career with the Greek League club Aris in 2010. With Aris, he played in the final game of the Greek Cup in 2014. Bochoridis' player rights were then sold to the Greek club Panathinaikos in July 2014, for €350,000 euros.

On July 29, 2014, Panathinaikos announced the signing of Bochoridis to a 5-year deal. The first statement of Bochoridis as a player of Panathinaikos, was that he was playing at the highest European level, and that he would do his best for the team. In his first season with Panathinaikos, he won the 2015 edition of the Greek Cup.

On September 23, 2015, he suffered a fractured fibula in a friendly game against Partizan, and he was subsequently ruled out of game action for at least a period of three months time. On 17 January 2016, he returned to action in a Greek League game, in a home win against his former club, Aris, which his team won by a score of 80–59. During the post-game press conference, Bochoridis stated that he was satisfied because of his return, and that he would do his best to help the team. In his second and third seasons with Panathinaikos, he won the 2016 edition and 2017 edition of the Greek Cup. With Panathinaikos, he also won the Greek League 2016–17 season championship.

He returned to Aris in December of 2017. On July 28, 2018, Bochoridis renewed his contract with Aris and was named team captain.

On July 23, 2020, Bochoridis made his return to Panathinaikos after two and a half years. He averaged 4.4 points, 1.8 rebounds and 2.2 assists, in under 16 minutes per EuroLeague contest. 

On July 26, 2021, he renewed his contract with the Greens for another year.
In 30 league games, he averaged 4.8 points, 1.8 rebounds and 1.5 assists, playing around 14 minutes per contest. Additionally, in 19 EuroLeague games, he averaged 2.1 points, 1 rebound and 1.3 assists, playing around 11 minutes per contest. On August 2, 2022, he re-signed for another season, his sixth overall with the club.

National team career

Greek junior national team
Bochoridis played with the junior national teams of Greece, at the 2011 FIBA Europe Under-18 Championship, and the 2012 FIBA Europe Under-18 Championship. He also played at both the 2013 FIBA Europe Under-20 Championship, and the 2014 FIBA Europe Under-20 Championship.

Greek senior national team
Bochoridis first became a member of the senior Greek national basketball team in 2018. He played at the 2019 FIBA World Cup qualification.

Career statistics

EuroLeague

|-
| style="text-align:left;"| 2014–15
| style="text-align:left;"| Panathinaikos
| 15 || 2 || 10.0 || .400 || .455 || .333 || 1.0 || 1.3 || 0.2 || .0 || 2.0 || 1.3
|-
| style="text-align:left;"| 2015–16
| style="text-align:left;"| Panathinaikos
| 2 || 0 || 5.3 || .000 || .000 || 1.000 || .0 || 0.5 || .0 || .0 || 1.0 || 1.0
|-
| style="text-align:left;"| 2016–17
| style="text-align:left;"| Panathinaikos
| 7 || 0 || 4.1 || .200 || .750 || .500 || .1 || .0 || .0 || .0 || 1.7 || .1

|- class="sortbottom"
| style="text-align:center;" colspan=2| Career
| 17 || 2 || 9.0 || .400 || .455 || .600 || 0.6 || 1.2 || 0.2 || .0 || 1.9 || 1.3

Awards and accomplishments
 Greek League Champion: (2017)
 4× Greek Cup Winner: (2015, 2016, 2017, 2021)
 3× Greek League All Star: (2018, 2019, 2020)

References

External links
Euroleague.net Profile
FIBA Profile
FIBA Europe Profile
Eurobasket.com Profile
Greek Basket League Profile 
NBADraft.net Profile
Draftexpress.com Profile
Eurohopes.com Profile
Instagram Profile

1994 births
Living people
Aris B.C. players
Greek men's basketball players
Panathinaikos B.C. players
Point guards
Shooting guards
Basketball players from Thessaloniki